Hood Aerodrome  is an aerodrome, located in Masterton, New Zealand, it is located 1 NM South West of the town centre in the suburb of Solway. The aerodrome was named after George Hood, a pioneer Masterton aviator who died trying to make the first Trans-Tasman crossing in 1928. The aerodrome is used extensively for general aviation flights, and has also been used for commercial flights, Air New Zealand stopped serving the airport from 5 February 2014. Two new airlines have looked at re-instating a service to Auckland using larger aircraft but the runway will need to be lengthened to 1400m and widened to 30m first before it can start.

History
The Masterton Aerodrome was opened in 1931.
Historically, Hood Aerodrome has been served by South Pacific Airlines of New Zealand in 1962–1966 and two locally based carriers, Wairarapa Airlines which linked Masterton with Auckland, Hamilton, Rotorua, Nelson and Christchurch from August 1981 to January 1997. Then a new airline Air Wairarapa briefly flew to Auckland via Paraparumu in 2002. Between February 2009 and February 2014, Eagle Airways, a subsidiary of Air New Zealand Link flew to Auckland from Masterton. The flights were operated by 19-seat Beechcraft 1900D aircraft. In September 2013, Air New Zealand announced the airline would withdraw all services to Masterton from 5 February 2014, due to a lack of demand.
The airport is working on a plan to reinstate an air service to Auckland with an invitation to the airlines underway.

Grass runway 06L/24R closed in November 2019 following an independent review of operations at the aerodrome.

Work to extend and widen the main runway is in the planning stage. The budget set for this project is $17 million.

Other Uses
The aerodrome is the home of New Zealand's 'Sports and Vintage Aviation Society', which has had a hangar on site since 1978.

Since 1999 Hood Aerodrome has held a biennial airshow, "Wings over Wairarapa". The eleventh such event took place on 26–27 February 2021, the final scheduled display on 28 February being cancelled due to a change in New Zealand's COVID-19 alert level.

The aerodrome land also hosts a purpose built dragstrip.

See also

 List of airports in New Zealand
 List of airlines of New Zealand
 Transport in New Zealand

References

External links

 Hood Aerodrome website
 NZ Sport and Vintage Aviation Society website
 Wairarapa Aero Club
 Hood Aerodrome and early flying in the Wairarapa
 Masterton motorplex drag racing site

Airports in New Zealand
Masterton
Buildings and structures in the Wairarapa
Transport buildings and structures in the Wellington Region